Avifauna are birds.

Avifauna may also refer to:
Vogelpark Avifauna, a bird park in Alphen aan den Rijn, Netherlands, or a hotel adjacent to it

See also
Fauna, the animal life of any particular region or epoch
List of country and regional avifaunas